Michael Heim is the name of:
 Michael C. Heim, vice president of information technology and chief information officer of Eli Lilly and Company
 Michael Henry Heim (1943–2012), UCLA translator and Professor of Slavic Studies and Literatures
 Michael R. Heim (born 1944), American author and educator